The 1993 Florida Marlins season was the 1st season for the team, part of the 1993 Major League Baseball expansion. Their manager was Rene Lachemann. They played home games at Joe Robbie Stadium. They finished 33 games behind the NL Champion Philadelphia Phillies, with a record of 64-98, sixth in the National League East Division, ahead of only the New York Mets.

The last remaining active member of the 1993 Florida Marlins was Trevor Hoffman, who retired after the 2010 season.

Offseason

1992 pre-expansion draft transactions
 February 14, 1992: Édgar Rentería was signed as an amateur free agent by the Marlins.
 June 1, 1992: Charles Johnson was drafted by the Marlins in the 1st round (28th pick) of the 1992 Major League Baseball draft. Player signed November 5, 1992.

Expansion draft
The 1992 MLB Expansion Draft was held on November 17, 1992. As opposed to previous expansion drafts such as the 1961 draft, players from both leagues were available to the expansion clubs. Each existing club could protect fifteen players on their roster from being drafted and only one player could be drafted from each team in the first round. Then for each additional round National League teams could protect an additional 3 players and American League teams could protect 4 more. All unprotected major and minor league players were eligible except those chosen in the amateur drafts of 1991 or 1992 and players who were 18 or younger when signed in 1990.

Round 1

Round 2

Round 3

Post-expansion draft transactions
 November 17, 1992: Eric Helfand and a player to be named later were traded by the Marlins to the Oakland Athletics for Walt Weiss. The Marlins completed the deal by sending Scott Baker to the Athletics on November 20.
 November 17, 1992: Greg Hibbard was traded to the Chicago Cubs for Alex Arias and Gary Scott.
 November 17, 1992: Danny Jackson was traded to the Philadelphia Phillies for Joel Adamson and Matt Whisenant.
 December 8, 1992: Charlie Hough was signed as a free agent by the Marlins.
 December 9, 1992: Terry McGriff was signed as a free agent with the Florida Marlins.
 February 20, 1993: Rick Renteria was signed as a free agent by the Marlins.

1992 MLB June amateur draft and minor league affiliates 
The Marlins and Colorado Rockies, set to debut in 1993, were allowed to participate in all rounds of the June 1992 MLB first-year player draft. The Marlins selected 28th overall in the first round, with catcher Charles Johnson their top (and most successful) pick. Of the 50 amateur free agents selected, only one other, pitcher Andy Larkin, reached the major leagues. The Marlins affiliated with two minor league clubs during 1992 to develop drafted players.

1992 farm system

Regular season
Due to the summer heat, the Marlins played in only 35 day games, the fewest in the majors.

1993 Opening Day lineup

Season standings

Record vs. opponents

Notable transactions
 May 22, 1993: Kevin Elster was signed as a free agent with the Florida Marlins.
 June 4, 1993: Kevin Elster was released by the Florida Marlins.
 June 9, 1993: Mike Jeffcoat was signed as a free agent with the Florida Marlins.
 June 24, 1993: Gary Sheffield was traded by the San Diego Padres with Rich Rodriguez to the Florida Marlins for Trevor Hoffman, José Martínez, and Andrés Berumen.
 June 27, 1993: Henry Cotto was traded by the Seattle Mariners with Jeff Darwin to the Florida Marlins for Dave Magadan.

Roster

Player stats

Batting

Starters by position
Note: Pos = Position; G = Games played; AB = At bats; H = Hits; Avg. = Batting average; HR = Home runs; RBI = Runs batted in

Other batters
Note: G = Games played; AB = At bats; H = Hits; Avg. = Batting average; HR = Home runs; RBI = Runs batted in

Pitching

Starting pitchers 
Note: G = Games pitched; IP = Innings pitched; W = Wins; L = Losses; ERA = Earned run average; SO = Strikeouts

Other pitchers 
Note: G = Games pitched; IP = Innings pitched; W = Wins; L = Losses; ERA = Earned run average; SO = Strikeouts

Relief pitchers 
Note: G = Games pitched; W = Wins; L = Losses; SV = Saves; ERA = Earned run average; SO = Strikeouts

Awards and honors

All-Stars 
MLB All-Star Game
 Gary Sheffield, reserve
 Bryan Harvey, reserve

Team leaders
 Games – Jeff Conine (162)
 At bats – Jeff Conine (595)
 Home runs – Orestes Destrade (20)
 Runs batted in – Orestes Destrade (87)
 Batting average – Jeff Conine (.292)
 Slugging percentage – Orestes Destrade (.406)
 On-base percentage – Walt Weiss (.367)
 Hits – Jeff Conine (174)
 Doubles – Jeff Conine (24)
 Triples – Benito Santiago (6)
 Walks – Walt Weiss (79)
 Hit by pitch – Bret Barberie (7)
 Stolen bases – Chuck Carr (58)
 Wins – Chris Hammond (11)
 Innings pitched – Charlie Hough (204.1)
 Earned run average – Charlie Hough (4.27)
 Strikeouts – Charlie Hough (126)

Farm system 

LEAGUE CHAMPIONS: High Desert

References

External links
1993 Marlins at Baseball Reference
1993 Florida Marlins at Baseball Almanac
1993 Schedule at Baseball Reference

Miami Marlins seasons
Florida Marlins season
Inaugural Major League Baseball seasons by team
Miami Marl